The NBA on ESPN Radio is a broadcast of National Basketball Association games on the ESPN Radio network. The program began on January 21, 1996 and the current contract runs through the extra season.

Coverage overview
The NBA on ESPN Radio broadcasts games on a weekly basis, many more than once. Game coverage includes:
Select weeknight games, with varying days on a week-by-week basis 
Christmas double header games
NBA Saturday Primetime games
Martin Luther King Jr. Day games
NBA All-Star Weekend festivities, including the All-Star Game
Select postseason games, including all of the NBA Finals

Commentators

Currently, the lead commentary team for the NBA on ESPN Radio is Marc Kestecher and Jon Barry, with occasional contributions provided by P. J. Carlesimo, Hubie Brown, Rosalyn Gold-Onwude, Corey Alexander and Kelenna Azubuike as analysts along with Sean Kelley for play-by-play. Sideline reporter-turned full-time color commentator Doris Burke joins the radio crew calling the conference finals and the NBA Finals since 2020. Past contributors to the NBA on ESPN Radio have included Jim Durham, Kevin Calabro, Brent Musburger, Mike Tirico, Dave Pasch, Dave Flemming, Doug Brown, Tim Legler, Howard David, Dr. Jack Ramsay, and Will Perdue.

Availability
As of 2022, the NBA on ESPN Radio is part of ESPN Radio’s main lineup, instead of in an opt-in/opt-out basis by ESPN Radio affiliates like in previous years (although affiliates retain the ability to opt out of broadcasts involving their in-market teams). It is also available in several regions outside the U.S. 

Most NBA on ESPN Radio games can be heard on mobile devices and connected televisions via the ESPN app as well as many other radio apps, including TuneIn and iHeartRadio (mostly from ESPN Radio affiliates streaming on iHeartRadio).

References

Press Release: 2006-07 NBA SEASON ON ESPN BEGINS NOV. 1
Press Release: NBA ON ESPN RADIO TIPS OFF NOV. 2
Houston Chronicle: Durham-Ramsay team to sign off after Finals

External links
NBA on ESPN Radio
ESPN Radio official website

American sports radio programs
ESPN Radio programs
ESPN Radio
1996 radio programme debuts
1990s American radio programs
2000s American radio programs
2010s American radio programs
2020s American radio programs